"A un passo dalla luna" is a 2020 Italian language single of Italian rapper Rocco Hunt and Spanish singer Ana Mena released on 3 July 2020. It is a reggaeton hit released on RCA and Sony. It reached the top of the Italian Singles Chart and spending 9 weeks at the top starting 24 July 2020. The Italian version also charted in Switzerland reaching number 31. A Spanish language version "A un paso de la luna" was launched in Spain and Spanish speaking countries. 

Lyrics for the song are by Rocco Pagliarulo (Rocco Hunt) and Federica Abbate, and music by Federica Abbate and Stefano Tognini.

Versions

A un paso de la luna	
In the same year of the release of the Italian single, a Spanish language version was released with the title "A un paso de la luna" for the Hispanic markets. It reached number 4 on the Spanish Singles Chart. Additional lyrics for the Spanish version included Andrés Torres, Jesús Navarro, Julio Ramírez and Bibi Marín.

Remix
In 2021, a remix of the song was released with Reik in addition to Rocco Hunt and Ana Mena. The version released by Sony Music Entertainment and Columbia Records charted in France.

Music video	
The music video was directed by Astronauts and was filmed in Ibiza, and released on 16 July 2020 on Rocco Hunt's official YouTube channel.

Awards
The song, in its Spanish version, earned the award for "Best Video Clip" at the Premios Odeón 2021.

Charts

Weekly Charts 

Remix

Year-end charts

Certifications

References

2020 songs
2020 singles
Ana Mena songs
Number-one singles in Italy
Reik songs